Louis de La Palud ( 1375 – 1451) (called the Cardinal of Varambon or the Cardinal of Maurienne) was a French Roman Catholic bishop and cardinal.

Biography

Louis de La Palud was born in Châtillon-la-Palud sometime between 1370 and 1380. He was the son of Aymé de La Palud, seigneur of Varambon, and Alix de Corgenon.

He studied at the Collège de Sorbonne, receiving a doctorate. He then entered the Order of Saint Benedict in Tournus, and was ordained as a priest. He became abbot of Our Lady of Ambronay in 1404, and then abbot of Tournus in 1413.

He was present at the Council of Constance (1414–18), during which time he served as guardian of the 1417 papal conclave that elected Pope Martin V. He later served as a deputy to the Council of Siena (1423–24), and then to the Council of Florence (1431–38).

Near the beginning of the Council of Florence, on June 6, 1431 he was elected Bishop of Lausanne. He was transferred to the see of Avignon on November 4, 1433. The Council of Florence sent La Palud to Greece to attempt a reconciliation with the Eastern Orthodox Church. When he returned to Basel, he adhered to the party of Antipope Felix V.

On April 12, 1440, Antipope Felix V made him a pseudocardinal in Thonon-les-Bains, awarding him the titular church of Santa Susanna. He was transferred to the see of Saint-Jean-de-Maurienne, in July 1441 and occupied that see until his death. In 1445, he became prior in commendam of Aiton.

Cardinal de La Palud later submitted to Pope Nicholas V. Nicholas V made him a cardinal priest in the consistory of December 19, 1449; he received the titular church of Sant'Anastasia al Palatino on January 12, 1450. He entered Rome on December 11, 1450 and received the red hat on December 12, 1450.

He died in Rome on September 21, 1451. He is buried in St. Peter's Basilica.

References

1370s births
1451 deaths
15th-century French cardinals
15th-century Roman Catholic bishops in the Holy Roman Empire
People from Ain
College of Sorbonne alumni
Benedictine abbots
Swiss Benedictines
Prince-bishops in the Holy Roman Empire
Bishops of Avignon
Bishops of Lausanne